Public holidays in the United States generally refers to holidays that are observed by the citizens of the United States.

Other uses include:
 Federal holidays in the United States refers to holidays observed by government employees
 School holidays in the United States refers to holidays observed by schools in the United States
 Public holidays in the United States Virgin Islands
 Public holidays in Puerto Rico
 Public holidays in Guam

See also
 :Category:Public holidays in the United States
 :Category:State holidays in the United States
 Government shutdowns in the United States